EWJ may refer to:

 East and West Junction Railway, an early British railway company
 Earthworm Jim (video game)
 iShares MSCI Japan, an exchange-traded fund